Dr. Ernest William Floyd (1876 – 15 January 1930) was a British physician and philatelist who signed the Roll of Distinguished Philatelists in 1927.

Philately
Floyd was a specialist in the line-engraved stamps of Great Britain, particularly the Penny Black, and also collected British Levant, Confederate States, Bergedorf, Heligoland, Modena, and Barbados. His collection of Penny Blacks was sold to Charles Nissen in anticipation of his service as a physician during World War One but it is unclear if he served. He won a number of medals in international stamp competitions. It was said of Floyd that he had an extremely quick eye in detecting any deviation from type and this was reflected in the important contribution he made to the effort to plate the Penny Black. He was a stalwart of the Manchester Philatelic Society and a member of the Royal Philatelic Society London from 1916.

References

Signatories to the Roll of Distinguished Philatelists
1876 births
1930 deaths
British philatelists
Fellows of the Royal Philatelic Society London
20th-century British medical doctors